Destiny Lanette Henderson (born 15 November 1991), also known as Sukihana, is an American reality television personality, rapper, and actress. She rose to prominence as a main cast member on the VH1 reality series Love & Hip Hop: Miami. She has released one mixtape, titled Wolf Pussy.

Early life
Sukihana was born and raised in Wilmington Delaware . She spent her formative years in creative art school, and was based in Atlanta, Georgia, before moving to Miami, Florida. She got her nickname from an Asian restaurant in the Christiana Mall, as someone joked she "tasted like Sukihana".

Career
Sukihana made her name as one of the stars on the third season of Love & Hip Hop: Miami, released in 2020. She made a cameo appearance in American rapper Cardi B's music video for her single "WAP", which was released on August 7, 2020.

In September 2020, she released her debut mixtape Wolf Pussy.

Discography 
 Wolf Pussy (2020)

Television

References

External links
 
 
 

1991 births
Living people
Musicians from Wilmington, Delaware
American women rappers
African-American women rappers
21st-century American rappers
21st-century American women musicians
21st-century American actresses
Songwriters from Delaware
Participants in American reality television series
African-American songwriters
21st-century African-American women
21st-century African-American musicians
21st-century women rappers